The 1981 WAFL season was the 97th season of the West Australian Football League in its various incarnations. The season opened on 11 April and concluded on 3 October with the 1981 WAFL Grand Final between Claremont and South Fremantle. It was the last WAFL season to begin in April and end in October; from 1982 the league shifted the schedule of the season forward by a week and in later years by another.

The 1981 WAFL season is famous because of its prodigious scoring, chiefly by premiers Claremont and runners-up South Fremantle. The Claremont trio of Warren Ralph, and brothers Jimmy and Phil Krakouer broke numerous records related to scoring in single matches and seasons. (It was to be the Krakouer brothers' last season at Claremont, before a move to  North Melbourne, where they introduced an attacking style of football to the VFL.) During 1981, the 1979 record score by Swan Districts was broken twice, with the last round record by South Fremantle still remaining as the highest score in senior WAFL history. The average score of 123 points per team per game is the highest in WAFL history and as much as ten points higher than the VFL/AFL maximum during 1982, whilst tailender Perth set the unenviable record of conceding 157 points per match, allowing under 100 only on a very wet day against East Perth.

Home-and-away season

Round 1

Round 2

Round 3

Round 4

Round 5

Round 6

Round 7

Round 8

Round 9

Round 10

Round 11

Round 12

Round 13

Round 14

Round 15

Round 16

Round 17

Round 18

Round 19

Round 20

Round 21

Ladder

Finals series

First semi-final

Second semi-final

Preliminary final

Grand Final

References

External links
Official WAFL website

West Australian Football League seasons
WAFL